Phasmodes, known as stick katydids, is a genus of insects in the family Tettigoniidae and the only genus within the subfamily Phasmodinae. It contains the following species:
 Phasmodes jeeba Rentz, 1993
 Phasmodes nungeroo Rentz, 1993
 Phasmodes ranatriformis Westwood, 1843

References

External links

Orthoptera of Australia
Orthoptera subfamilies
Tettigoniidae
Tettigoniidae genera
Taxonomy articles created by Polbot